Clinidium halffteri is a species of ground beetle in the subfamily Rhysodinae. It was described by R.T. & J.R. Bell in 1985. It is named after the entomologist Gonzalo Halffter, the co-collector of the type series. The type locality is Amates in southern Veracruz, Mexico, near the Gulf of Mexico at a low elevation. Males in the type series measure  in length.

References

Clinidium
Beetles of North America
Endemic insects of Mexico
Beetles described in 1985